The Romanian Financial Supervisory Authority (Ro:Autoritatea de Supraveghere Financiară (ASF)) is a national Romanian governmental agency responsible for financial regulation in Romania. Its mandate is to regulate, supervise, and control nonbank markets in Romania.

The ASF is run by a council of nine members with five of the nine in executive positions: these consist of a president, a head vice president, and three vice presidents for sectors: insurance-reinsurance, capital markets and private pensions.

History
The Authority was founded on April 26, 2013 through the merger of three prior regulatory bodies that had covered the same area of responsibility - the CSA, CNVM, and CSSP.

The ASF is placed under the control of the Romanian Parliament. It has three areas of activity, insurance-reinsurance, capital markets, and private pensions.

References

External links 
 official site

Government agencies of Romania
Financial regulatory authorities of Romania